The Magaliesberg Biosphere Reserve is located in South Africa between the cities of Pretoria and Johannesburg to the east and Rustenburg to the west. The reserve lies at the interface of two great African biomes — the Central Grassland Plateaux and the sub-Saharan savannah — and the remnants of a third biome, the Afro‐montane forest. The rich biodiversity includes floral species such as Aloe peglerae and Frithia pulchra, and faunal species such as the forest shrew (Myosorex varius), sable antelope (Hippotragus niger) and 443 bird species representing 46.6% of total bird species in the southern African sub-region.

Geography 
The area is characterised by remarkable scenic beauty and unique natural features. As a typical biosphere reserve, it contains a core zone with buffer and transition zones surrounding it. The reserve has two core zones; the first of which is the Cradle of Humankind World Heritage site which encompasses cultural heritage sites and sites of archaeological interest dating back to 4 million years. The second core zone is the  Magaliesberg Protected Natural Environment.

Ecological characteristics 
The reserve includes a variety of landscapes including slopes, cliffs, crests, kloofs, rivers, wetlands and valleys. Although the area covers a diverse geological area, it consists mainly of the Magaliesberg mountain complex comprising two geological formations: the Transvaal System and the Bushveld Igneous Complex. These formations contain the richest platinum and platinum group minerals in the world and its varied topography hosts 14 different vegetation types.

The reserve contains four important habitats: the Moot Plains Bushveld, characterised by open to closed, low and often thorny savannah dominated by various species of Acacia; the Gold Reef Mountain Bushveld, characterised by rocky hills and ridges with more dense woody vegetation; the Northern Afrotemperate Forest, characterised by low, relatively species-poor forests of afromontane origin; and the Marikana Thornveld, characterised by open Acacia karroo woodlands occurring in valleys, slightly undulating plains and some lowland hills.

A total of 90 indigenous mammal species have been recorded in the Magaliesberg Biosphere Reserve. These include the klipspringer (Oreotragus oreotragus), sable antelope (Hippotragus niger), leopard (Panthera pardus) and brown hyena (Parahyaena brunnea). The bird diversity in the area is exceptional. In total, 46.6% of the bird species recorded in the southern African sub-region are found in the reserve. These include the Cape vulture (Gyps coprotheras), secretary bird (Sagittarius serpentarius), great white pelican (Pelecanus onocrotalus), martial eagle (Polemaetus belliccosus) and African grass-owl (Tyto capensis).

Socioeconomic characteristics 
The area faces high levels of unemployment and poverty. The main economic activities are agriculture, mining, urban development and tourism. The reserve has a total population of 196,728 inhabitants, significantly lower than that of the neighbouring cities of the metropolitan areas (Johannesburg and Pretoria) within whose boundaries it falls. The area has witnessed a melting pot of different cultural groups over millennia, often at war with one another, resulting in a rich and varied cultural history representative of the larger South Africa.

The main economic activities are agriculture, mining, urban development and tourism, although the unemployment range is high with numbers between 25% and 40%.

In terms of historical value there are few places on the planet where better evidence of deep time can be found. The Cradle of the Humankind World Heritage Site, consisting of 13 listed fossil sites and 400 unexplored caves, contains a superbly preserved record of the stages in the evolution of humankind over the past 4 million years. It includes one of the most important Stone Age sites in the world and a sizeable proportion of the total number of hominid skulls discovered on the planet.

Sources

References 

Biosphere reserves of South Africa